A satellite is an artificial object which has been intentionally placed into orbit, such as:

 Atmospheric satellite, a non-orbital unmanned aerial vehicle (UAV) that operates in the atmosphere at high altitudes for extended periods of time
Communications satellite

Satellite or satellites may also refer to:

Astronomy
 Natural satellite, an orbiting object not man-made and not in direct orbit around the Sun or another star; a moon
 Satellite planet, a planetary-mass moon
 Satellite galaxy, a galaxy that orbits another

Communication
 Satellite television, television service provided over Earth-orbiting satellites
 Satellite phone
 Satellite radio, radio service provided over Earth-orbiting satellites
 Satellite Internet access, Internet service provided over Earth-orbiting satellites

Geography
 Satellite state, a dependent country
 Commuter town, a town within commuter range of a larger city
 Satellite campus, which is physically detached from the main campus
 Satellite Island (Tasmania), Australia
 Satellite Island (Washington), USA
 The Satellite (Antarctica), a small rock peak in Antarctica

Music
 Les Satellites, a French alternative rock band
 Satellite (Polish band), a progressive rock band
 Satellite (US band), an alternative rock band
 Satellite Records (1957–1960), now Stax Records
 Satellites, a musical project of John Garrison

Albums
 Satellite (P.O.D. album) or the title song (see below), 2001
 Satellite (Panic Room album) or the title song, 2010
 Satellite (The Player Piano album), 2007
 Satellite EP or the title song (see below), by Guster, 2007
 Satellite, by Sam Paganini, 2014
 Satellite, by Stephen Ashbrook, 1995
 Satellites (album), by The Big Dish, 1991

Songs
 "Satellite" (The Beloved song), 1996
 "Satellite" (Dave Matthews Band song), 1994
 "Satellite" (Guster song), 2006
 "Satellite" (The Hooters song), 1987
 "Satellite" (Lena Meyer-Landrut song), 2010; also recorded by Jennifer Braun, 2010
 "Satellite" (P.O.D. song), 2001
 "Satellite" (Rise Against song), 2011
 "Satellite" (Starset song), 2017
 "Satellit" by Ted Gärdestad, 1979
 "Satellites" (song), by September, 2005
 "Satellite", by Aimee Mann from Bachelor No. 2 or, the Last Remains of the Dodo, 2000
 "Satellite", by All Time Low from Future Hearts, 2015
 "Satellite", by Anna Nalick from Wreck of the Day, 2005
 "Satellite", by Axle Whitehead from Losing Sleep, 2008
 "Satellite", by BT from Movement in Still Life, 1999
 "Satellite", by Catherine Wheel from Adam and Eve, 1997
 "Satellite", by Collective Soul from Youth, 2004
 "Satellite", by Def Leppard from On Through the Night, 1980
 "Satellite", by Depeche Mode from A Broken Frame, 1982
 "Satellite", by Elliott Smith from Elliott Smith, 1995
 "Satellite", by Elton John from Ice on Fire, 1985
 "Satellite", by Elvis Costello from Spike, 1989
 "Satellite", by Gabbie Hanna, 2017
 "Satellite", by Harry Styles from Harry's House, 2022
 "Satellite", by Icehouse from Big Wheel, 1993
 "Satellite", by Joe Jackson from Fast Forward, 2015
 "Satellite", by John Coltrane from Coltrane's Sound, 1964
 "Satellite", by the Kills from Blood Pressures, 2011
 "Satellite", by Little Boots from Nocturnes, 2013
 "Satellite", by Loona from [+ +], 2019
 "Satellite", by Mayday Parades from Sunnyland, 2018
 "Satellite", by Natalie Imbruglia from White Lilies Island, 2001
 "Satellite," by Nickelback from No Fixed Address, 2014
 "Satellite", by Nine Inch Nails from Hesitation Marks, 2013
 "Satellite", by OceanLab, 2004
 "Satellite", by Orchestral Manoeuvres in the Dark, a B-side of the single "Dreaming", 1988
 "Satellite", by Rebecca Black, 2018
 "Satellite", by Richard Wright from Broken China, 1996
 "Satellite", by the Sex Pistols, B-side of the single "Holidays in the Sun", 1977
 "Satellite", by Smash Mouth from Astro Lounge, 1999
 "Satellite", by TV on the Radio from Young Liars, 2003
 "Satellite", by the Wanted from The Wanted, 2012
 "Satellite", by Yo La Tengo from May I Sing with Me, 1992
 "Satellites", by Beyoncé from I Am... Sasha Fierce, 2008
 "Satellites", by Cherry Monroe, 2005
 "Satellites", by the Cinema from My Blood Is Full of Airplanes, 2011
 "Satellites", by Don Diablo from Future, 2018
 "Satellites", by James Blunt from Moon Landing, 2013
 "Satellites", by Mew from + -, 2015
 "Satellites", by Rickie Lee Jones from Flying Cowboys, 1989
 "Satellites", by Sleeping with Sirens from Feel, 2013
 "Satelllliiiiiiiteee", by Flying Lotus from Cosmogramma, 2010
 "Satellite", a digital single by Bae Suzy,2022

Biology
 Satellite (biology), a sub-viral agent
 Satellite (moth), a species of moth
 Satellite DNA
Minisatellite 
Microsatellite
Satellite chromosome, a chromosome structure

Other uses
 Satellite tornado, a smaller tornado that orbits around a larger "parent" tornado
 Satellite (software), an open source system management system developed by Red Hat
 NES Satellite, a Nintendo Entertainment System accessory
 Plymouth Satellite, any of several car models built by Plymouth in the 1960s and early 1970s
 Toshiba Satellite, a product line of notebook computers
 Satellite, the name for the old Domino City in the anime Yu-Gi-Oh! 5D's
 Satellite portfolio, an investment strategy, see Core & Satellite
 Satellite tournament, a minor tournament or event on a competitive sporting tour
 Client software Satellite of defunct peer-to-peer file-sharing system Audiogalaxy (1998-2002)

See also
 Ciudad Satélite, in Naucalpan, Mexico
 Sattalites, a Canadian reggae group
 Satelight, an animation studio in Japan
 Satelit, a neighborhood of the Serbian city of Novi Sad